The Chumash Casino Resort is owned and operated by the Santa Ynez Band of Chumash Mission Indians.

History
Opened in its present form in August 2003, the casino consists of a 94,000-square-feet (8,730 m2) gaming area with slot machines and table games. A 106-room hotel and spa opened in July 2004. In 2006, the Casino estimated that there were 2,894,561 visitors to the Casino and 34,049 guests in the hotel, nearly all of them from Southern California. The Santa Ynez Band of Chumash Mission Indians have estimated that their casino brings in some 6,000 patrons per day.

Music
Musicians who have appeared include : Al Green, Charlie Daniels, Clint Black, Cristian Castro, The Doobie Brothers, Fleetwood Mac, Hank Williams Jr., Intocable, Johnny Mathis, Kenny Rogers, Kiss, Los Tigres del Norte, The Moody Blues, Pepe Aguilar, Rose Royce, Smokey Robinson, The Spinners, and ZZ Top.

Sport
Chumash hosts Elite Xtreme Combat mixed martial arts as well as the Star Voice competition show.

See also
 Native American gaming
 List of casinos in California
 Solvang, California
 Santa Ynez Valley

References

External links

Casinos in California
Hotels in California
Native American casinos
Resorts in California
Casino hotels
Chumash